The men's 400 metres hurdles event at the 1975 Summer Universiade was held at the Stadio Olimpico in Rome on 19 and 20 September.

Medalists

Results

Heats

Final

References

Athletics at the 1975 Summer Universiade
1975